The 1934–35 season was Manchester United's 39th season in the Football League. Having narrowly avoided relegation to the Third Division North the previous season, they progressed to fifth place, just six points short of promotion.

Second Division

FA Cup

Squad statistics

References

Manchester United F.C. seasons
Manchester United